Aurelio Casadei, known as Secondo Casadei (1 April 1906 – 19 November 1971) was an Italian musician, violinist, arranger, composer and bandleader.

He is considered the most important exponent of liscio (literally "smooth"), an Italian style of dance and folk music born in Emilia-Romagna.

He is best known for being the author of the famous popular song Romagna mia.

His nephew is the musician and composer Raoul Casadei.

References 

1906 births
1971 deaths
20th-century Italian musicians